Islah Jad (born 1951) is a tenured Assistant Professor of Gender and Development at Birzeit University. She is also the co-founder and current Director of the Institute of Women’s Studies at Birzeit and a Core Group Member of the Arab Families Working Group. A prominent figure in the Palestinian women’s movement, Jad also helped to establish the Women’s Affair Centre in Gaza and Nablus, Les Amies du Francis, the Child Corner project in el-Bireh, and the WATC (Women’s Affairs Technical Committee). Jad carried out Gender Consultancy for the United Nations Development Programme and was a co-author of the United Nation’s Arab Human Development Report of 2005. She earned a bachelor's degree in political science from Cairo University, a master's degree in political theory from the University of Nantes, and a Ph.D. in gender and development studies from the University of London. In July, 2009 Jad received AMIDEAST’s Teaching Excellence Award.

WATC was established in 1992 in Ramallah, West Bank.

Selected publications
Jad, Islah. 2005. “Islamist Women of Hamas: A New Women’s Movement?” In On Shifting Ground; Muslim Women in a Global Era, edited by Fereshteh Nouraie-Simone. New York: The Feminist Press.
UNDP. Jad, Islah (core team member) and others. 2006. Arab Human Development Report, 2005: Women’s Empowerment. New York: UNDP.
Jad, Islah. 2005-2006. “Letters from Ramallah.” Bahithat 11: 206-226.
−−−. 
−−−. 
−−−. 
−−−. 
−−−. 
−−−. 
−−−. 
−−−. 
−−−. 
Jad, Islah. 2020. "NGOs: Between Buzzwords and Social Movements." In Women's Grassroots Mobilization in the MENA Region Post-2011 (Kelsey Norman, ed.).Baker Institute (Houston, TX). 28 June 2020. https://doi.org/10.25613/j0tx-w723

See also
Diaspora Studies
Women in Islam
Palestine
Women’s Studies
Gender Studies
Transnationalism
Development Studies

References

External links
Feature in Media Monitors Network: http://www.mediamonitors.net/islahjad1.html 
Interview with the Monthly Review: http://mrzine.monthlyreview.org/2009/jones180109.html
Feature in Newsweek: http://www.newsweek.com/2008/04/28/our-dreams-are-dead.html

Living people
Palestinian activists
Palestinian feminists
Palestinian women in politics
Alumni of the University of London
People associated with SOAS University of London
Academic staff of Birzeit University
Feminist studies scholars
1951 births